A night auditor works at night at the reception of a hotel.

Description
The night auditor typically handles both the duties of the front desk agent and some of the duties of the accounting department. This is necessitated by the fact that most fiscal days close at or around midnight, and the normal workday of the employees in the accounting department does not extend to cover this time of day. Work shifts for night auditors usually run from 11 p.m. to 7 a.m. but could vary depending on the hotel, with shifts of 10 p.m. to 6 a.m. or midnight to 8 a.m. being common.  Work weeks vary by hotel as well, with most hotels having a full-time auditor working five nights a week (typically Sunday through Thursday) and a separate part-time auditor working the other two nights a week (Friday and Saturday).

In larger hotels, night auditors may work alongside other nighttime employees such as the night manager, hotel security guards, night porters, telephone attendants, room-service attendants, and bellhops.  Some larger hotels have multiple night auditors, while in smaller hotels and motels, the night auditor may work alone or be "on-call", meaning that once he or she completes running the daily reports, the auditor retires to an area away from the desk but remains available to attend to unexpected requests from guests.

In the smallest hotels and some bed and breakfast establishments, the front desk may close entirely overnight. Guests in such facilities are typically given a contact number for an employee or manager, who may be sleeping on the premises or live nearby, for use in case of emergency.

Functions 
The night audit itself is an audit of the guest ledger (or front office ledger); that is, the collection of all accounts receivable for currently registered guests. It can also be defined as the collection of all guest folios, the billing receipts for currently registered guests. The purpose of the night auditor includes, but is not limited to, ensuring the accuracy of all financial information and gathering all needed paperwork to complete the audit. This will include pulling any or all checked-out guests' registration cards and making sure guests are checked out in the system.

One task of the night auditor is posting the day's room rate and room tax to each guest folio at the close of business, which usually occurs between midnight and 2 o'clock in the morning. Second, the night auditor must ensure the accuracy of charges to the guest folios, verify that the sum of revenues due to accounts receivable from the various departments (e.g., food and beverage, rooms, gift shop) found on the department control sheets equals the sum of the charges made to the guest folios.

Front desk function

In addition to the accounting function, night auditors may also be required to perform the typical front desk functions during the graveyard shift.  These functions include check-in, check-out, reservations, responding to guest complaints, coordinating housekeeping requests, and handling any emergencies that may arise.  It is not especially required, but a good habit nonetheless, that the night auditor keep printouts of various reports on paper at the Front Desk (some hotels call these "contingency reports") in the event that a power outage takes place at a hotel. 

Night auditors may work alongside a security officer to maintain a level of security during late-night hours for both night staff and guests.  In addition to balancing the guest ledger, the night auditor is usually responsible for balancing the city ledger and the advance ledger.  The city ledger consists of money owed to the hotel by credit card companies and direct bill accounts.  The city ledger also contains house accounts, such as management dry cleaning charges, or local phone call charges which are usually adjusted (written) off at the end of each month.  The advance ledger is aptly named because it is a ledger for guests who have sent money in advance to either pay for or guarantee their stay.  These funds are posted to the advance ledger when received by the hotel, and then transferred to the guests folio (in the guest ledger) upon arrival of that guest.

At some hotels, there are times when reservations are made for the hotel that exceed available inventory of rooms, resulting in an "oversold" situation.  The night auditor is usually the hotel employee that must deal with this if the hotel is still oversold by the time of the night audit shift.  If a guest arrives who has an oversold reservation, the auditor ends up having to calm the guest and find them suitable alternate accommodations, preferably nearby, then process the transfer accordingly as per the hotel's standards.  This can be a lengthy process depending on the number of affected guests and length of time necessary to find alternate accommodations; having to deal with oversold situations can affect the time it normally takes a night auditor to do the audit, manager reports, and change of day in the hotel's computer system.

References

Further reading 
 
 
 

Accountancy occupations
Hospitality occupations